Michael Campbell (born 11 September 1978 in Kingston) is a retired male track and field sprinter from Jamaica.

Career

He specialized in the 200 metres and the 400 metres during his career. His personal best time in the men's 200 metres was 21.07 seconds, achieved on 30 May 2004 in Sacramento, California. Campbell won a gold medal in the men's  relay at the 2003 Pan American Games, alongside Sanjay Ayre, Lansford Spence, and Davian Clarke.

Achievements

External links
 
 
 Player Bio at Arizona State University
 Picture of Michael Campbell
 

1978 births
Living people
Sportspeople from Kingston, Jamaica
Jamaican male sprinters
Athletes (track and field) at the 2003 Pan American Games
Athletes (track and field) at the 2004 Summer Olympics
Olympic athletes of Jamaica
Pan American Games medalists in athletics (track and field)
Pan American Games gold medalists for Jamaica
Medalists at the 2003 Pan American Games